David Garrick as Richard III is a painting dating from 1745 by the English artist William Hogarth.

The painting shows the actor and stage manager David Garrick in the role of Richard III in Shakespeare's play Richard III.  It depicts a dramatic moment in the play on the eve of the Battle of Bosworth (1485). The king, who had been asleep in his tent on the battlefield, has just woken from a dream in which he has seen the ghosts of the opponents he had previously murdered. Hogarth was a friend of Garrick, who had gained a degree of fame through his portrayal of Richard III at the Drury Lane Theatre in London. The painting shows the actor with fear and concern, one arm raised and with a shocked expression on his face.

Hogarth, best remembered for his satirical prints on social themes, was also a skilled painter and portraitist. This painting, much more than just a portrait, shows the subject at a key time in history, and also in theatrical pose. It falls between the commonly accepted genres of portraiture and historical painting. The pose used by Hogarth was similar to other that used for other portraits of actors, especially those by Zoffany. Having compared Hogarth's painting with those of Garrick by Reynolds, Gill Parry concludes that Hogarth had helped to establish a new subgenre within portraiture, that of the theatrical portrait. The pose adopted by the actor was described by Hogarth as "the serpentine line"; he saw it as "being composed of two curves contrasted". In his 1753 treatise The Analysis of Beauty he suggests that this is a particularly beautiful shape which "gives play to the imagination and delights the eye".

It is owned by the Walker Art Gallery in Liverpool, Merseyside, England, and was purchased by the gallery in 1956 with help from the National Art Collections Fund.

References

Sources

Paintings by William Hogarth
1745 paintings
Fiction set in the 1480s
Paintings in the collection of the Walker Art Gallery
Works based on Richard III (play)
Paintings based on works by William Shakespeare
Portraits of actors
David Garrick
Cultural depictions of British men
Cultural depictions of actors